The men's 1.5 kilometre sprint classic competition of the 2018 Winter Paralympics was held at Alpensia Cross-Country and Biathlon Centre in Pyeongchang. The competition took place on 14 March 2018.

Medal table

Visually impaired

Qualification

Finals

Semifinal 1

Semifinal 2

Final

Standing

Qualification

Finals

Semifinal 1

Semifinal 2

Final

Sitting

Qualification

Finals

Semifinal 1

Semifinal 2

Final

See also
Cross-country skiing at the 2018 Winter Olympics

Men's 1.5 kilometre sprint classical